Felicity Margaret Heal,  (born 24 September 1945) is a British historian and academic, specialising in early modern Britain. From 1980 to 2011, she was a lecturer at the University of Oxford and a Fellow of Jesus College, Oxford. She had previously taught or researched at Newnham College, Cambridge, the Open University, and the University of Sussex.

Early life and education
Heal was born on 24 September 1945 in Hemel Hempstead, Hertfordshire, England, to John and Winifred Chandler. She was educated at Lewes Girls' Grammar School, an all-girls state grammar school in Lewes, Sussex. She studied history at Newnham College, Cambridge, graduating with a Bachelor of Arts (BA) degree in 1967 and a Doctor of Philosophy (PhD) degree in 1970. Her doctoral thesis was titled "The Bishops of Ely and their diocese during the reformation period: ca. 1515–1600".

Academic career
Heal's main research concerns the late fifteenth to the mid-seventeenth centuries of early modern Britain. She specialises in the religious history, such as the Reformation, and the social history of that era. She also has an interest in gift giving.

From 1970 to 1973, Heal was a research fellow of Newnham College, Cambridge. For the 1975/1976 academic year, she was visiting fellow of Yale University and Stanford University. From 1976 to 1978, she was a staff tutor at the Open University. From 1977 to 1979, she was a lecturer in history at the University of Sussex.

In 1980, Heal was elected a Fellow and Tutor in modern history of Jesus College, Oxford, and appointed a lecturer of the Faculty of History, University of Oxford. She served as Chair of the Faculty of History from 1999 to 2001, and as Deputy Head of the Humanities Division of Oxford University from 2009 to 2011. In 2011, she retired from full-time academia and was appointed Emeritus Fellow of Jesus College, Oxford.

Personal life
Heal has one daughter from her first marriage. In 1988, she married Clive Holmes, a fellow Oxford historian. She has two step sons from her second marriage.

Honours
Heal is an elected Fellow of the Royal Historical Society (FRHistS). In 2015, she was elected a Fellow of the British Academy (FBA), the United Kingdom's national academy for the humanities and social sciences.

Selected works

References

1945 births
Living people
20th-century British historians
21st-century British historians
British women historians
Historians of the British Isles
Social historians
Reformation historians
Historians of the early modern period
Fellows of Newnham College, Cambridge
Academics of the Open University
Academics of the University of Sussex
Fellows of Jesus College, Oxford
Historians of the University of Oxford
Alumni of Newnham College, Cambridge
Fellows of the Royal Historical Society
21st-century British women writers
20th-century British women writers